Athlitikos Omilos Levante F.C. is a Greek football club, based in Agioi Pantes and Galaro, Zakynthos.

The club was founded in 1991. They will play for the first time in Gamma Ethniki for the season 2015–16.

Honors

Domestic Titles and honors
 Eps Zakynthos Champions: 1
 2014-15
 Eps Zakynthos Cup Winners: 1
 2014-15

External links
 http://ao-levante.blogspot.gr

Football clubs in Greece
Football clubs in Zakynthyos
Association football clubs established in 1991
1991 establishments in Greece